Judge Caldwell may refer to:

Alexander Caldwell (Virginia judge) (1774–1839), judge of the United States District Court for the Western District of Virginia
Henry Clay Caldwell (1832–1915), judge of the United States Court of Appeals for the Eighth Circuit
Karen K. Caldwell (born 1956), judge of the United States District Court for the Eastern District of Kentucky
William W. Caldwell (1925–2019), judge of the United States District Court for the Middle District of Pennsylvania

See also
Justice Caldwell (disambiguation)